Nifurtoinol (rINN, trade name Urfadyn) is a nitrofuran-derivative antibiotic used in the treatment of urinary tract infections.

It is also known as "hydroxymethylnitrofurantoin".

References

Hydantoins
Nitrofurans
Hydrazones